Valentina Troka (born 15 November 2002) is an Albanian footballer who plays as a defender for Tirana AS and the Albania national team.

International career
Troka made her debut for the Albania national team on 9 April 2021, coming on as a substitute for Luçije Gjini against Bosnia and Herzegovina.

See also
List of Albania women's international footballers

References

2002 births
Living people
Women's association football defenders
Albanian women's footballers
Albania women's international footballers
KFF Tirana AS players
Sportspeople from Fier